The  in Tokyo, Japan, is the foremost museum collecting and exhibiting modern Japanese art.

This Tokyo museum is also known by the English acronym MOMAT (National Museum of Modern Art, Tokyo). The museum is known for its collection of 20th-century art and includes Western-style and Nihonga artists.

History
The National Museum of Modern Art, Tokyo, was the first National Museum of Art in Japan and dates back to 1952, when it was established as an institution governed by the Ministry of Education. The architect of the building was Kunio Maekawa. On two later occasions, neighbouring premises were purchased and the Museum was further enlarged.  The most recent re-design of MOMAT was conceived by Yoshirō Taniguchi (father of Yoshio Taniguchi who designed the extension of MOMA in New York).

Collections
The collection contains many notable Japanese artists since the Meiji period as well as a few contemporary Western prints.
 
In the early years of the 20th century, Matsukata Kojiro collected Japanese  ukiyo-e woodblock prints which had been scattered throughout the world.  The 1925 exhibition of the woodblock prints Matsukata collected abroad is thought to have been the first of its kind in Japan. Today approximately 8,000 ukiyo-e prints from the Matsukata collection are housed in the Tokyo National Museum.

Crafts Gallery
In 1977, the museum opened an annex, the Kōgeikan Crafts Gallery, that collects and exhibits textiles, ceramics, lacquer, and other Japanese crafts as well as craft and design from around the world dating from the late 19th century to the present. Its collection focus in particular is the work of Japanese Living National Treasures. The Crafts Gallery maintains its own research library.

In 2020, as part of the Japanese government's policy to revitalize local areas, the Crafts Gallery was relocated to Kanazawa and the National Crafts Museum was opened there. Even after the relocation, the official name is still the National Museum of Modern Art, Tokyo Craft Gallery.

National Film Center
Up until April 2018, the National Museum of Modern Art housed the National Film Center (NFC), which was Japan's only public institution devoted to cinema. In April 2018, the NFC became independent of the Art Museum and was officially elevated to the rank of a national museum under the name the National Film Archive of Japan.

Union catalog
The "Union Catalog of the Collections of the National Art Museums, Japan" is a consolidated catalog of material held by the four Japanese national art museums—the National Museum of Modern Art in Kyoto (MOMAK), the National Museum of Modern Art in Tokyo (MOMAT), the National Museum of Art in Osaka (NMAO), and the National Museum of Western Art in Tokyo (NMWA):

 National Museum of Modern Art, Kyoto (MOMAK).
 National Museum of Modern Art, Tokyo (MOMAT)
 National Museum of Art, Osaka (NMAO)
 National Museum of Western Art (NMWA)

The online version of this union catalog is currently under construction, with only selected works available at this time.

Notes

See also

 List of Independent Administrative Institutions (Japan)
 Visage Painting and the Human Face in 20th Century Art

References
 Checkland, Olive. (2002). Japan and Britain After 1859: Creating Cultural Bridges. London: Routledge. 
 Falk, Ray.   "French Art in Tokyo," New York Times. June 21, 1959.

External links 
 
 National Museum of Modern Art, Tokyo (in English)
 Artfacts.net: MOMAT overview
  Independent Administrative Institution National Museum of Art (in Japanese)
 Show of Leiko Ikemura in the National Museum of Modern Art, Tokyo 2012

National museums of Japan
Buildings and structures in Chiyoda, Tokyo
Art museums and galleries in Tokyo
Modern art museums in Japan
Art museums established in 1952
1952 establishments in Japan